Begoña Vargas (born 1999) is a Spanish actress and dancer.

Biography 
Begoña Vargas was born in Madrid in 1999. At age 10, she started studies at a dance school in Loeches, after which she also began to train her acting chops. While Vargas made her television debut by playing a guest role in Centro Médico and also performed in Paquita Salas, she had her television breakthrough role in La otra mirada. She ensuingly landed main roles in Boca Norte and High Seas. She made her feature film debut with a performance in the 2020 horror film 32 Malasana Street. In 2020, she joined the casts of Daniel Monzón's Outlaws (starring alongside Marcos Ruiz and Chechu Salgado) and Daniel Calparsoro's Centauro (starring alongside Carlos Bardem and Àlex Monner). In 2021, she joined the casts of the Netflix series Welcome to Eden and the second season of the Movistar+ fantasy series Paradise.

Filmography

Film

Television

Accolades

References

External links
 

21st-century Spanish actresses
Spanish television actresses
Spanish film actresses
Living people

1999 births